IRSF is an acronym that may mean:

 Inland Revenue Staff Federation, a trade union in the United Kingdom
 The South African Astronomical Observatory's  Infrared Survey Facility
 International Revenue Share Fraud, a type of phone fraud.